Fuğanlı (also, Fuqanlı, Fuganly, and Fughanli) is a village in the Jabrayil District of Azerbaijan. On 20 October 2020 President of Azerbaijan Ilham Aliyev announced that the village was recaptured by Azerbaijan.

References 

Populated places in Jabrayil District